Port Union is a historical community overlooking Trinity Bay and Catalina Harbour, on the east side of the Bonavista Peninsula, Newfoundland and Labrador, Canada.

William Coaker founded the town as the base for the Fishermen's Protective Union in 1916. It was the base for the publication of the Fishermen's Advocate journal.

In 1999, the original part of the town and the nearby hydroelectric plant were designated a National Historic Site of Canada.

In 2005, Port Union was amalgamated with Catalina and Melrose to form the town of Trinity Bay North.

In 2012, the local fish plant closed.

See also
 Fishermen's Protective Union
 List of communities in Newfoundland and Labrador
 Newfoundland outport

References

External links
 Historic Port Union Website

Former towns in Newfoundland and Labrador
Populated coastal places in Canada
Populated places in Newfoundland and Labrador
National Historic Sites in Newfoundland and Labrador
Trinity Bay North